Paulo dos Santos (born 14 April 1960) is a Brazilian former footballer who played as a midfielder. He competed in the 1984 Summer Olympics with the Brazil national football team.

References

1960 births
Living people
Association football midfielders
Brazilian footballers
Olympic footballers of Brazil
Footballers at the 1984 Summer Olympics
Olympic silver medalists for Brazil
Olympic medalists in football
Sport Club Internacional players
Medalists at the 1984 Summer Olympics
20th-century Brazilian people